This is a list of Monuments in Kathmandu Metropolis -19, officially recognized by and available through the website of the Department of Archaeology, Nepal in the Kathmandu District. Kathmandu is a historically rich city and Hindu temples are the main attraction of this Metropolis. The monument list below is populated using the authentic information at Department of Archaeology.

List of Monuments

|}

See also 
 List of Monuments in Bagmati Zone
 List of Monuments in Nepal

References 

Metropolis 19
Kathmandu-related lists